Manfred Ross (born 20 January 1940) is a German rower. He won a gold medal at the 1962 World Rowing Championships in Lucerne with the men's coxed four.

References

1940 births
Living people
West German male rowers
World Rowing Championships medalists for West Germany
European Rowing Championships medalists